Joseph Turner (21 March 1931 - 8 February 2008) was an English footballer who made 176 appearances in the Football League playing for Stockport County, Darlington, Scunthorpe United and Barnsley in the 1950s and early 1960s. A goalkeeper, he also played non-league football for Denaby United and Goole Town.

References

1931 births
2008 deaths
Footballers from Barnsley
English footballers
Association football goalkeepers
Denaby United F.C. players
Stockport County F.C. players
Darlington F.C. players
Scunthorpe United F.C. players
Barnsley F.C. players
Goole Town F.C. players
English Football League players